Sesame Beginnings is a line of products and a video series, spun off from the children's television series Sesame Street, featuring baby versions of the characters. The line is targeted towards infants and their parents, and products are designed to increase family interactivity.

Product line
The line was launched mid-2005 in Canada, with a line of products exclusive to a family of Canadian retailers that includes Loblaws, Fortinos, and Zehrs. The initial offering included apparel, health and body, home, and seasonal products.

Soon after, the line expanded to products, including Random House books, available in the United States. Target is the primary retailer for the items in the US. Other Sesame Beginnings licensors include Crown Crafts (bedding), Fisher-Price (infant toys), BBC (footwear), Children's Apparel Network (department and specialty store layette, newborn and infant apparel), Hamco, Blue Ridge, Baby Boom, and AD Sutton.

All products in the Sesame Beginnings line are ranked on a scale of 1 to 5. Products ranked Level 1 are for birth to 6 months, Level 2 are for 6 to 12 months, Level 3 for 12 to 18 months, Level 4 targets 18 to 24 months, and Level 5 aims for 24–36 months.

DVD series
The first Beginnings videos were in stores April 23, 2006.

 Beginning Together Brandy and her daughter Sy'rai appear in the video.
 Make Music Together Wayne Brady and his daughter Maile appear in the video.
 Exploring Together Matt Lauer and his daughter Romy host the video.
 Moving Together Sarah Jessica Parker and her friend Sophia appear in the video.

Cast
 Kevin Clash as Baby Elmo
 Bill Barretta as Elmo's dad "Louie"
 Fran Brill as Baby Prairie Dawn
 Leslie Carrara-Rudolph as Prairie Dawn's mom
 Matt Vogel as Baby Big Bird
 Pam Arciero as Big Bird's aunt "Nani Bird"
 Tyler Bunch as Baby Cookie Monster
 Rickey Boyd as Cookie Monster's grandma
 Caroll Spinney as Big Bird's grandma "Granny Bird"

Crew
 Jocelyn Hassenfeld, producer
 Dionne Nosek, producer
 Kevin Clash, co-producer, director
 Christine Ferraro, writer
 Liz Nealon, Executive Vice President, Creative Director, Sesame Workshop
 Rosemarie T. Truglio, Vice President Education and Research, Sesame Workshop
 Anna E. Housley Juster, Director of Content, Sesame Workshop
 Sandblast Productions
 Handcranked Productions

Books
There were some Sesame Street books published before Beginnings, starring the characters as babies. These books included photography of puppet-like models created of the characters. In contrast, Beginnings books feature flat colour illustrations of the characters.

 Cookie Kisses (with Baby Cookie Monster, level 1)
 Sesame Beginnings to Go: At the Store (with Baby Grover, level 2)
 Sesame Beginnings to Go: Away We Go (with Baby Zoe, level 2)
 Sesame Beginnings to Go: In My Stroller (with Baby Elmo, level 1)
 Sesame Beginnings to Go: Time to Eat (with Baby Cookie Monster, level 1)
 Snap! Button! Zip! (with Baby Zoe, level 3)
 Cookie Rhyme, Cookie Time (with Baby Cookie Monster, level 4)
 Hello! Good-bye! (with Baby Ernie, level 3)
 Clang-Clang! Bang-Bang! (with Baby Grover, level 1)
 So Big! (with Baby Elmo, level 2)
 Baby Faces (with Baby Zoe, level 1)
 Cookie See! Cookie Do! (with Baby Cookie, level 3)
 Pat-A-Cake and Other First Baby Games (with Baby Elmo and Baby Zoe, level 4)
 Peekaboo! I See You! (with Baby Big Bird, level 2)
 Sing a Song of Sixpence (with Baby Zoe and Baby Ernie, level 5)
 It's Naptime, Little One (with baby Elmo, Prairie Dawn, Cookie Monster, Grover, Curly Bear, and Big Bird, level 3)
 Eyes & Nose, Fingers & Toes (with Baby Elmo, Cookie Monster, Big Bird, Zoe and Grover)
 At the Zoo (with Baby Elmo, Cookie Monster, Big Bird and Zoe)
 Bubbles, Bubbles (with Baby Elmo, Cookie Monster, Big Bird, Ernie and Bert)
 Nighty Night (with Baby Elmo, Cookie Monster, Big Bird, Zoe, Ernie, Bert and Snuffleupagus)

History of the line
Sherrie Westin, Executive Vice President comments: "Our own research showed that Sesame Street videos were among those frequently viewed by the under two set, in spite of the fact that the content and curriculum of Sesame Street is designed for ages 2-5. With the Sesame Beginnings DVDs, we're providing parents and caregivers of children under two with content specifically designed to use media as a tool to further adult/child interaction."

The same "underviewing" of Sesame Street is what had earlier inspired show producers to add in the very young-targeted Elmo's World segment.

The concept of the Sesame Street cast as babies was not entirely new, as "baby-ized" versions of characters were available as toys since 2002. Many likened the line to previous series like Muppet Babies.

Controversy and criticism
The production of DVDs and other screen-based media for children under the age of two is extremely controversial. The American Academy of Pediatrics recommends that children under two be kept away from screen media and Sesame Beginnings has been criticized by a number of early childhood development experts who point to research suggesting that television viewing by babies can harm language development and sleep patterns. An April 23, 2006 article in The Washington Post quoted Harvard Medical School psychologist Susan Linn as saying "There is no evidence that media is beneficial for babies, and they are starting to find evidence that it may be harmful. Until we know for sure, we shouldn't risk putting them in front of the television."

Sesame Street Kids’ Guide to Life has countered such criticism by pointing to their partnership with Zero to Three, a respected American nonprofit child-development and advocacy organization, to produce the DVDs and also that they were extensively researched and tested by respected experts in childhood development. However, one of Zero to Three's original founders, noted pediatrian T. Berry Brazelton, was among the signatories of a letter of protest that was submitted to Zero to Three calling on the organization to disassociate itself with the project.

Advisory board
Beginnings, like all Sesame Workshop and Kids’ Guide to Life projects, included an advisory committee of "national child development and media experts"
 Daniel R. Anderson, Ph.D., University of Massachusetts Amherst
 Rachel Barr, Ph.D., Georgetown University
 Lori A. Custodero, D.M.A., Teachers College, Columbia University
 Claire Lerner, L.C.S.W., ZERO TO THREE
 Kyle Pruett, M.D., Yale University School of Medicine
 Claudia A. Saad, M.A., CCC-SLP, American Speech–Language–Hearing Association

References

External links

 Sesame Beginnings, official site
 Random House: Sesame Beginnings books
 Zero to Three, production partner
 Washing Post Article - "Experts Rip 'Sesame' TV Aimed at Tiniest Tots"
 NPR Talk of the Nation: 'Sesame Beginnings' Targets Baby TV Viewers, 3 April 2006

Sesame Street